Athylia punctithorax is a species of beetle in the family Cerambycidae. It was described by Breuning in 1939. It is mainly found in the Philippines.

References

Athylia
Beetles described in 1939